Broadcasting House was the headquarters of BBC Cymru Wales' radio, television and online services, situated in north Cardiff. The purpose-built facility opened in 1966 and consists of three blocks containing studios, offices and technical facilities. In 2020 the BBC moved out, transferring to BBC Cymru Wales New Broadcasting House in Central Square, Cardiff. The building was demolished in 2021 to 2022, with the site to be used for housing.

The building housed the national broadcaster for Wales, providing a range of English and Welsh language content for audiences across Wales on television, radio and online.

History

Broadcasting House was designed by Welsh architect Dale Owen (1924–97). Construction began in 1963. The BBC moved into the building in 1966, which housed production and technical facilities, and was the principal base for BBC Cymru Wales. It was officially opened by Princess Margaret on St David's Day (1 March) 1967.

The building is located in the Llandaff area of northern Cardiff, near the River Taff. It is close to Danescourt railway station and served by several Cardiff Bus services.

The BBC National Orchestra of Wales (BBC NOW) and the BBC National Chorus of Wales moved out of Studio 1 at Broadcasting House into a new facility, BBC Hoddinott Hall at the Wales Millennium Centre in 2009. Much of the BBC television drama studio facilities moved out in 2011 to a new facility in Roath Lock, Cardiff Bay.

In August 2013, it was announced that Broadcasting House and Ty Oldfield (Oldfield House), which is opposite Broadcasting House, was for sale, with plans to move to a new a purpose-built headquarters in Cardiff by 2018. The BBC has said that the "ageing infrastructure at Llandaff is clearly reaching the end of the road and it is time to look to the future". It was said that they considered three possible sites in Cardiff;
 Central Square, which is north of Cardiff Central railway station
 Land south of the railway station
 Land between the Senedd building and the UK headquarters of Atradius.

The Welsh Government's historic environment service Cadw advised that the building should be Grade II listed, but in 2014 John Griffiths, the Welsh Minister for Culture and Sport,  overrode the advice and decided not to list the building. The decision was criticised by The Twentieth Century Society, which described it as one of Wales' most outstanding and important post war buildings. In 2014, it was confirmed that Broadcasting House and Ty Oldfield would be demolished and turned into 400 residential units.

The BBC confirmed in 2015 that Central Square would be the location of their new headquarters building. The BBC began to move out of the Llandaff studios during 2019. Wales Today were the last to make the move on 25 September 2020. In September 2020, BBC Wales closed Broadcasting House and completed the move to Central Square.

The site was acquired by the development company Taylor Wimpey for a housing development, and  Broadcasting House was demolished in 2021 to 2022.

Architecture
The building was modernist in style, and aspects of Dale Owen's design reflected Walter Gropius's 1948 design of the Graduate Center at Harvard University in Massachusetts. Owen had studied at Harvard, and had spent a year working in Gropius's architectural practice,  The Architects Collaborative. The design was also influenced by Mies van der Rohe's 1949 design of the Lake Shore Drive apartment buildings in Chicago.

The building incorporated a long low-rise section housing the studios and a tower for the administration offices. The use of a concrete structural frame enabled large areas of glazing, and the main Llantrisant Road elevation was partially glazed.

Programming
Television programmes produced at Broadcasting House Cardiff included BBC Wales Today, Newyddion, Doctor Who Confidential, The Chatterley Affair, Pobol y Cwm, Belonging, High Hopes, Satellite City and The District Nurse.

It was announced in March 2009 that the BBC would move the filming of shows such as Casualty and Crimewatch to the Roath Lock studios in Cardiff.

See also

 BBC Cymru Wales New Broadcasting House
 Roath Lock
 Media in Cardiff

References

External links

 
 

BBC offices, studios and buildings
Television in Wales
British television studios
Buildings and structures in Cardiff
BBC Cymru Wales
Buildings and structures completed in 1966
Modernist architecture in Wales
Office buildings in Cardiff
Demolished buildings and structures in Wales
Buildings and structures demolished in 2021